Bandarenka is a gender-neutral Belarusian-language form of the Ukrainian surname Bondarenko (from , cooper). The surname may refer to:

 Artsem Bandarenka (born 1991), Belarusian triple jumper
 Natallia Bandarenka (born 1978), Belarusian sprint canoer
 Raman Bandarenka, Belarusian designer murdered by police during the 2020 protests
 Vitali Bandarenka (born 1985), Belarusian boxer

See also
 
 Bondarenko

Belarusian-language surnames
Surnames of Ukrainian origin